La Foire de Guibray is a one-act farce by Alain-René Lesage.  It was first performed at the Foire de Saint Laurent in 1714.  La Foire de Guibray is actually a prologue to two other one-act farces, Arlequin Mahomet and Le Tombeau de Nostradamus.  Between the three works, Lesage created a comedy in three acts.

Plot summary
Arlequin and Scaramouche come to the Guibray Fair in order to steal things from merchants.  When Scaramouche talks about how scared he is of the judge of the town, Arlequin suggests that they disguise themselves as Arab actors to avoid suspicion.

Meanwhile, the judge and Pierrot are walking through the fair, watching the various theatrical and musical acts.  An Italian actor offers to entertain the judge, when Arlequin walks up and proposes his own play.  The judge suggests a competition between the two.  Arlequin will perform Arlequin Mahomet, and the Italian will perform Le Tombeau de Nostradamus.

Characters 
 The judge of Guibray
 Pierrot, his secretary
 Arlequin, a thief posing as an Arab actor
 Scaramouche, a thief posing as an Arab actor
 An Italian actor
 Two actresses
 A musician

1714 plays
Plays by Alain-René Lesage